One Fierce Beer Run  is the title of The Bloodhound Gang's first DVD. It is a behind-the-scenes look at the One Fierce Beer Coaster tour based on the album of the same name. Most of the footage is from the tour bus and has almost no concert footage. The movie also contains music videos from the album including "Fire Water Burn", "Kiss Me Where It Smells Funny" and others.

The band are also seen picking on drummer Spanky G in many scenes - the end scene features him, handcuffed and with a pillow case over his head, pushed into an elevator and left to wander a different floor of the hotel the band were staying in. This is the rumored reason why Spanky left the group in 1999 - the real reason was that he left to focus on his studies.

The film was intended to be released in 1998, but was delayed until 2003. The copyright notice at the end of the film says "(C) 2002 Geffen Records".

After 5 minutes of black screen following the copyright notice, a short scene plays showing two women engaging in cunnilingus, followed by Jimmy Pop and Jared Hasselhoff clapping.

References

Bloodhound Gang video albums